Benthobia tryonii is a species of sea snail, a marine gastropod mollusc in the family Benthobiidae.

Description

Distribution
This species occurs in the Atlantic Ocean off the Sahara.

References

 Sysoev A.V. (2014). Deep-sea fauna of European seas: An annotated species check-list of benthic invertebrates living deeper than 2000 m in the seas bordering Europe. Gastropoda. Invertebrate Zoology. Vol.11. No.1: 134–155
 Simone, L. R. L. (2003). Revision of the genus Benthobia (Caenogastropoda, Pseudolividae. Journal of Molluscan Studies. 69-73

External links
 Dall W.H. 1889. Reports on the results of dredging, under the supervision of Alexander Agassiz, in the Gulf of Mexico (1877–78) and in the Caribbean Sea (1879–80), by the U.S. Coast Survey Steamer "Blake", Lieut.-Commander C.D. Sigsbee, U.S.N., and Commander J.R. Bartlett, U.S.N., commanding. XXIX. Report on the Mollusca. Part 2, Gastropoda and Scaphopoda. Bulletin of the Museum of Comparative Zoölogy at Harvard College, 18: 1–492, pls. 10-40
 ocard A. (1897–1898). Expéditions scientifiques du Travailleur et du Talisman pendant les années 1880, 1881, 1882 et 1883. Mollusques testacés. Paris, Masson. vol. 1 [1897], pp. 1–516 pl. 1–22; vol. 2 [1898], pp. 1–515, pl. 1–18
  Rosenberg, G.; Moretzsohn, F.; García, E. F. (2009). Gastropoda (Mollusca) of the Gulf of Mexico, Pp. 579–699 in: Felder, D.L. and D.K. Camp (eds.), Gulf of Mexico–Origins, Waters, and Biota. Texas A&M Press, College Station, Texas
 Bouchet, P.; Warén, A. (1985). Revision of the Northeast Atlantic bathyal and abyssal Neogastropoda excluding Turridae (Mollusca, Gastropoda). Bollettino Malacologico. supplement 1: 121–296
 

Benthobiidae
Gastropods described in 1889